All The Amendments is the second EP from Brisbane musician Tara Simmons and was released in February, 2007.

It features the single "The Recycling Bin Song," which received airplay on Triple J after both announcer Caroline Tran and music director Richard Kingsmill took a liking to it.

Track listing
 "Trip Over"
 "Ballet"
 "The Recycling Bin Song"
 "Patience"

References

2007 EPs
Tara Simmons albums